, or Mount Kumaga, is a stratovolcano located in the Daisetsuzan Volcanic Group of the Ishikari Mountains, Hokkaidō, Japan.

See also
 List of volcanoes in Japan
 List of mountains in Japan

References
 Geographical Survey Institute
 Synonyms and Subfeatures of Daisetsu, Global Volcanism Program, Smithsonian National Museum of Natural History, last access 10 July 2008.

Mountains of Hokkaido
Volcanoes of Hokkaido
Stratovolcanoes of Japan